Kurtzia ephaedra is a species of sea snail, a marine gastropod mollusk in the family Mangeliidae.

Description
The length of the shell attains 8.3 mm, its diameter 3.2 mm.

(Original description) The small, slender, acute shell is very pale brown or whitish. The apical whorl of the protoconch is minute, transparent, smooth, bubble-like, followed by 1½ faintly reticulate whorls. The 5½  subsequent whorls shows a deep appressed suture. The spiral sculpture consists of alternate threads with narrower interspaces, the major threads (on the spire two or three) rather prominent, especially the posterior one, which forms a sort of shoulder to the whorl, more conspicuous in the earlier whorls. The minor threads usually number one on the spire, but on the body whorl sometimes two or even three in the interspaces between the major threads. The threads are little or not at all swollen where they cross the ribs but are rendered harsh by the intersection of fine sharp close-set incremental lines. Other axial sculpture consists of (on the body whorl seven) prominent rounded ribs, crossing the whole whorl, with subequal interspaces, and practically continuous vertically up the spire. tTere is no obvious anal fasciole. The aperture is narrow. The anal sulcus is shallow and rounded, with no subsutural callus. The outer lip is subvaricose, moderately infolded, with a sharp edge and smooth inside. The inner lip is erased. The siphonal canal is short, wide, hardly recurved.

Distribution
This species occurs in the Pacific Ocean off Panama.

References

 Liu J.Y. [Ruiyu] (ed.). (2008). Checklist of marine biota of China seas. China Science Press. 1267 pp

External links
  Tucker, J.K. 2004 Catalog of recent and fossil turrids (Mollusca: Gastropoda). Zootaxa 682:1–1295.
 Biolib.cz : Image of Kurtzia ephaedra
 Vera, Hidalgo, and Angel Klever. Estado ecológico de fondos marinos blandos en las inmediaciones de Esmeraldas, año 2016. Diss. Tesis previa obtención del título de Ingeniero/a en Gestión Ambiental, 2016.

ephaedra